Benedict Charles Franzetta (August 1, 1921 - September 26, 2006) was an American Bishop of the Catholic Church. He served as auxiliary bishop of the Diocese of Youngstown from 1980 to 1996.

Biography
Born in East Liverpool, Ohio, Benedict Franzetta was ordained a priest for the Diocese of Youngstown on April 29, 1950.  On March 14, 1984 Pope John Paul II appointed him as the Titular Bishop of Opitergium and Auxiliary Bishop of Youngstown.  He was ordained a bishop by Bishop James Malone on September 4, 1980. The principal co-consecrators were Archbishop Joseph Bernardin of Cincinnati and Bishop William Hughes of Covington.  He continued to serve as an auxiliary bishop until his resignation was accepted by Pope John Paul II on September 4, 1996.  He died on September 26, 2006, at the age of 85.

References

1921 births
2006 deaths
People from East Liverpool, Ohio
20th-century American Roman Catholic titular bishops
Catholics from Ohio